Romine is an unincorporated community in Taylor County, in the U.S. state of Kentucky.

History
A post office called Romine was established in 1901, and remained in operation until 1942. Melvin Romine, the first postmaster, gave the community his name.

References

Unincorporated communities in Taylor County, Kentucky
Unincorporated communities in Kentucky